The Memba are a tribal group of Arunachal Pradesh, India.

Memba may also refer to: 

 Memba District in Mozambique
 Memba Bay in Mozambique